

Gmina Skarszewy is an urban-rural gmina (administrative district) in Starogard County, Pomeranian Voivodeship, in northern Poland.

Villages
Apart from the town of Skarszewy, Gmina Skarszewy contains the villages and settlements of Bączek, Barka, Bolesławowo, Bożepole Królewskie, Celmerostwo, Czarnocin, Demlin, Godziszewo, Godziszewo-Wybudowanie, Jaroszewy, Jastrzębce, Jastrzębie Skarszewskie, Junkrowy, Kamierowo, Kamierowskie Piece, Koźmin, Krawusin, Malary, Marianka, Mirowo Duże, Mirowo Małe, Nowe Gołębiewko, Nowy Wiec, Nygut, Obozin, Pogódki, Pogódki-Wybudowanie, Probostwo, Przerębska Huta, Rusia, Szczodrowo, Szczodrowski Młyn, Trzcianka, Wałachowo, Więckowy, Wilcze Góry, Wilki, Wolny Dwór, Zamkowa Góra and Zapowiednik.

Neighbouring gminas
Gmina Skarszewy is bordered by the gminas of Liniewo, Nowa Karczma, Przywidz, Stara Kiszewa, Starogard Gdański, Tczew, Trąbki Wielkie and Zblewo.

References
Polish official population figures 2006

Skarszewy
Starogard County